Josiah Charles Trent (August 7, 1914  December 10, 1948) was an American surgeon and a historian of medicine. He is notable for his collection of rare books and manuscripts documenting the history of western medicine. After his death, his widow, Mary Duke Biddle Trent Semans, donated his collection of books to Duke University. Today, this collection forms the foundation of the History of Medicine Collections in the David M. Rubenstein Rare Book & Manuscript Library.

Biography

Early life
Josiah Charles Trent was born in Okmulgee, Oklahoma, on 7 August 1914, the youngest of four children. His father, Josiah Charles Trent, was from Arkansas and a merchant who did business with both settlers and Native Americans. His mother, Mary Simpson Trent, was born in Mississippi and was a music teacher.

Education
As a child, Trent attended the public schools in Okmulgee, Oklahoma, and was graduated from high school with honors at the age of sixteen. He then attended Duke University, and received his A.B. degree with honors in 1934 at the age of 19. He then began studying medicine at the University of Pennsylvania, where he received an M.D. with honors in 1938. While there, he developed an interest in surgical pathology and the history of medicine. Following his graduation from the University of Pennsylvania, Trent began a one-year medical internship at the Henry Ford Hospital in Detroit, Michigan.

Career
In 1939, he began a residency at the Duke University School of Medicine, which lasted six years. At its completion, Trent was offered two positions at Duke: become a junior member of the Department of Surgery in general surgery or develop, as head, a Division of Thoracic Surgery. He chose the latter option, but asked for two years to gain additional experience. During that period, he served as instructor in thoracic surgery at the University of Michigan. There, he worked under Dr. John Alexander, who was the University's first Head of Thoracic Surgery. While at Michigan, he gained experience in the operation and administration of thoracic surgical case management. However, he only stayed there a year. At his request, he left his position at Michigan and returned to Duke to begin the Division of Thoracic Surgery.
As part of his professional service, Trent was a member of the North Carolina Medical Journal and the Journal of the History of Medicine and Allied Sciences editorial boards. Between 1944 and 1947, he edited a column called "Thumbnail Sketches of Eminent Physicians" for the North Carolina Medical Journal; many of the articles were also written by Trent. He served the Army Medical Library as an honorary consultant. In 1948, he presented papers on the history of medicine at the American Association of the History of Medicine and the Grolier Club.

He was a member of the American Association of the History of Medicine, Charaka Club, and Grolier Club, which reflected his interest in the history of medicine and in collecting books and manuscripts.

Professional Affiliations
Durham-Orange County Medical Society (Secretary-Treasurer, 1947-1948)
Founders Group of the American Board of Thoracic Surgery
Duke Hospital Library Committee (Chairman)
Friends of the Duke University Library (Executive Committee)
American Medical Association (Medical History Section, Secretary)
American Board of Surgery
Society of University of Surgeons
American College of Surgeons
National Tuberculosis Association
National Trudeau Society

Trent discontinued his Southern Medical Association membership because he felt they discriminated against black physicians.

Illness and death
In 1941, Trent had surgery for an abdominal mass which was identified as an abdominal lymphosarcoma. In 1946, he underwent surgery to relieve intracranial pressure resulting from the lymphosarcoma. However, by November 1948, the disease became widely disseminated and he died in December in Durham, North Carolina.

Personal life

Marriage and children
In 1938, at the age of 24, Trent married Mary Duke Biddle Trent Semans. Their marriage has been described as "one of rare happiness." They had four daughters:

Mary Duke Trent Jones,
Sarah Elizabeth Trent Harris,
Rebecca Gray Trent Kirkland, and
Barbara Biddle Trent Kimbrell.

Philanthropy
Trent believed that "current medicine is most successfully practiced and understood by persons who are knowledgeable of its history," as cited in NCpedia.  In 1938, while living in Detroit, this belief led Trent and his wife, Mary Duke Biddle Trent Semans, to begin collecting items relating to the history of medicine. They also collected materials relating to Walt Whitman, who was a favorite author of Semans'. In 1945, the Trent's donated their Whitman materials to Duke University to promote "student interest in and use of original sources." After Trent's death, his widow Mary Duke Biddle Trent Semans also donated their collection of materials on the history of medicine to Duke University School of Medicine. As of 2015, the collection is housed in the David M. Rubenstein Rare Book & Manuscript Library.

Josiah Charles Trent also started the first blood bank at Duke University.

Beginning in 1948 until his death, Josiah Charles Trent began serving as a trustee on the board of Lincoln Hospital in Durham, North Carolina. The Duke family was among the founders of the hospital, which served African Americans in Durham County and the surrounding area.

Legacy
After the death of Josiah Charles Trent, his family made several contributions to Duke University in his memory. The Josiah Charles Trent Memorial Foundation was founded in 1977 by Mary Duke Biddle Trent Semans and her second husband Dr. James H. Semans, which provides seed grants for Duke University faculty and staff who are researching topics in the history of medicine and related areas. The Foundation also established the Josiah Charles Trent Professorship in the History of Medicine and the Josiah Charles Trent Scholar in Medical Humanities at Duke University. Duke University's Trent Center for Bioethics, Humanities, & History of Medicine is also named for Josiah Charles Trent.

Bibliography

1914 births
1948 deaths
Duke University alumni
American medical historians
American surgeons
Perelman School of Medicine at the University of Pennsylvania alumni
University of Michigan staff
20th-century surgeons